There was no defending champion, due to the cancellation of the semifinals in 1998 due to rain.

Julie Halard-Decugis won the title, defeating compatriots Nathalie Tauziat in the final 6–2, 3–6, 6–4.

Seeds
All sixteen seeds received a bye to the second round.

Draw

Finals

Top half

Section 1

Section 2

Bottom half

Section 3

Section 4

Qualifying

Seeds

Qualifiers

Qualifying draw

First qualifier

Second qualifier

Third qualifier

Fourth qualifier

Fifth qualifier

Sixth qualifier

Seventh qualifier

Eighth qualifier

References
 1999 DFS Classic Draws
 ITF Tournament Page
 ITF singles results page

Singles
DFS Classic - Singles